The 1996 Meath Senior Football Championship was the 104th edition of the Meath GAA's premier club Gaelic football tournament for senior graded teams in County Meath, Ireland. The tournament consists of 18 teams, with the winner going on to represent Meath in the Leinster Senior Club Football Championship. The championship starts with a group stage and then progresses to a knock out stage.  
 
Dunderry were the defending champions after they defeated Kilmainhamwood in the previous years final.

After losing all of their matches including a 44-point defeat to champions Kilmainhamwood, St. Colmcille's applied to be regraded to the 1997 I.F.C.

On 21 November 1996, Kilmainhamwood claimed their 1st Senior Championship title with a win over Seneschalstown in the final. Brian Stafford lifted the Keegan Cup for the 'Wood while Martin Crosbie claimed the 'Man of the Match' award.

Team changes

The following teams have changed division since the 1995 championship season.

To S.F.C.
Promoted from I.F.C.
 Simonstown Gaels  -  (Intermediate Champions)

From S.F.C.
Regraded to I.F.C.
 ???

Group stage

Group A

Round 1:
 Simonstown Gaels 0-13, 1-8 Ballinlough, Nobber, 7/4/1996,
 Moynalvey 3-8, 2-3 Carnaross, Trim, 7/4/1996,
 Slane 0-11, 1-6 St. Michael's, Rathkenny, 7/4/1996,

Round 2:
 St. Michael's 0-10, 0-8 Simonstown Gaels, Kilberry, 28/4/1996,
 Moynalvey 1-7, 0-5 Slane, Walterstown, 5/5/1996,
 Ballinlough 2-7, 1-6 Carnaross, Oldcastle, 5/5/1996,

Round 3:
 St. Michael's 2-10, 0-11 Carnaross, Kells, 25/5/1996,
 Slane 0-10, 1-3 Simonstown Gaels, Pairc Tailteann, 25/5/1996,
 Moynalvey 2–6, 0-12 Ballinlough, Pairc Tailteann, 23/6/1996,
                       
Round 4:
 Slane 3-9, 0-11 Carnaross, Castletown, 23/6/1996,
 Simonstown Gaels 1–9, 1-9 Moynalvey, Kells, 14/7/1996,
 Ballinlough 2-7, 0-11 St. Michael's, Kells, 6/8/1996,

Round 5:
 St. Michael's 0–8, 4-10 Moynalvey, Walterstown, 6/9/1996,
 Slane 1–7, 3-8 Ballinlough, Pairc Tailteann, 6/10/1996,
 Simonstown Gaels l, w Carnaross,

Group B

Round 1:
 Navan O'Mahonys 4-13, 1-2 St. Colmcille's, Slane, 7/4/1996,
 Summerhill 0-18, 1-12 Gaeil Colmcille, Walterstown, 7/4/1996,
 Kilmainhamwood 2–7, 3-12 Seneschalstown, Pairc Tailteann, 7/4/1996,

Round 2:
 Summerhill 1-15, 0-3 St. Colmcille's, Skryne, 21/4/1996,
 Kilmainhamwood 3-9, 1-9 Gaeil Colmcille, Castletown, 28/4/1996,
 Seneschalstown 1-11, 1-5 Navan O'Mahonys, Pairc Tailteann, 28/4/1996,

Round 3:
 Seneschalstown 0-9, 0-6 Summerhill, Skryne, 5/5/1996,
 Kilmainhamwood 1-13, 0-14 Navan O'Mahonys, Carlanstown, 5/5/1996,
 Gaeil Colmcille 1-22, 2-6 St. Colmcille's, Kilberry, 10/5/1996,
            
Round 4:
 Seneschalstown 2-14, 1-9 Gaeil Colmcille, Pairc Tailteann, 25/5/1996,
 Summerhill 0-10, 0-5 Navan O'Mahonys, Pairc Tailteann, 26/5/1996,
 Kilmainhamwood 10-19, 0-5 St. Colmcille's, Syddan, 26/5/1996,

Round 5:
 Summerhill 1–11, 0-15 Kilmainhamwood, Pairc Tailteann, 6/10/1996,
 Navan O'Mahonys w, l Gaeil Colmcille,
 Seneschalstown w/o, scr St. Colmcille's,

Group C

Round 1:
 Dunderry 1-10, 1-8 Trim, Kells, 7/4/1996,
 Skryne 1-16, 1-8 Oldcastle, Athboy, 7/4/1996,
 Walterstown 0–6, 4-12 St. Peter's Dunboyne, Kilmessan, 7/4/1996,

Round 2:
 Trim 0-7, 0-6 Walterstown, Pairc Tailteann, 21/4/1996,
 Skryne 1–5, 1-7 St. Peter's Dunboyne, Pairc Tailteann, 21/4/1996,
 Oldcastle 1-9, 0-9 Dunderry, Athboy, 5/5/1996,

Round 3:
 St. Peter's Dunboyne 0-15, 1-9 Trim, Kilmessan, 5/5/1996,
 Walterstown 0–6, 2-5 Oldcastle, Athboy, 25/5/1996,
 Skryne 0–12, 1-11 Dunderry, Pairc Tailteann, 23/6/1996,
                
Round 4:
 St. Peter's Dunboyne 3-9, 1-5 Oldcastle, Pairc Tailteann, 1/8/1996,
 Dunderry 0-16, 1-2 Walterstown, Pairc Tailteann, 5/10/1996,
 Skryne 1-11, 1-9 Trim, Kells, 6/10/1996,

Round 5:
 Oldcastle 1–8, 0-11 Trim, Kilskyre, 19/10/1996,
 Skryne 1-14, 2-8 Walterstown, 20/10/1996,
 Dunderry 0-14, 0-10 St. Peter's Dunboyne, 20/10/1996,

Knock-out Stage

Finals

Quarter-Final:
 Ballinlough 1–10, 2-8 St. Peter's Dunboyne, Pairc Tailteann, 26/10/1996,
 Kilmainhamwood 2-9', 2-7 Dunderry, Kells, 26/10/1996,

Semi-Final:
 Moynalvey 1–4, 3-15 Kilmainhamwood, Pairc Tailteann, 2/11/1996,
 Seneschalstown 1-10, 0-12 St. Peter's Dunboyne, Pairc Tailteann, 3/11/1996,

Final:
 Kilmainhamwood 2-12, 1-6 Seneschalstown, Pairc Tailteann, 17/11/1996,

References

External links

Meath Senior Football Championship
Meath Senior Football Championship